Bailleul-lès-Pernes (literally Bailleul near Pernes) is a commune in the Pas-de-Calais department in the Hauts-de-France region of France.

Geography
A farming village located 25 miles (40 km) northwest of Arras, on the D90 road.

Population

Sights
 The church of St. Omer, dating from the eighteenth century.
 The vestiges of an ancient castle.

See also
Communes of the Pas-de-Calais department

References

External links

 Bailleul-lès-Pernes on the Quid website 

Communes of Pas-de-Calais